The 79th Brigade was a formation of  the British Army. It was raised as part of the new army also known as Kitchener's Army and assigned to the 26th Division and served on the Western Front and the Macedonian Front during the First World War.

Formation
The infantry battalions did not all serve at once, but all were assigned to the brigade during the war.
10th (Service) Battalion, Devonshire Regiment
8th (Service) Battalion, Duke of Cornwall's Light Infantry 	 
12th (Service) Battalion, Hampshire Regiment 	 
7th (Service) Battalion, Wiltshire Regiment
79th Machine Gun Company 	
79th SAA Section Ammunition Column 
79th Trench Mortar Battery

References

Infantry brigades of the British Army in World War I